The Northwestern Miners was an Australian rules football club based in St Helens, Merseyside, England.

History
The St Helens Miners formed for the 2002 British Australian Rules Football League season.  They were the first aussie rules club to be based in the north of England for some time, the Liverpool Blues having been the most recent in the area around 10 years earlier.  The Miners struggled onfield against the strong London-based clubs initially, but their situation improved after joining the new BARFL Regional series in 2003.  In 2004, the club renamed itself the Northwestern Miners to better attract players from across the region, avoiding old rivalries between St Helens and other towns such as Wigan and Warrington.  They formed an alliance with the Southport Sharks, a powerful club playing in the AFL Queensland and began wearing the Sharks' jumper rather than the Footscray Bulldogs jumpers they had previously used.

The Miners folded mid-2004, although some ex-Miners went on the play for the Manchester Mosquitos when this club formed in 2006 and the Liverpool Eagles who formed in 2008.

See also

References

External links

Australian rules football clubs in England
2002 establishments in England
Australian rules football clubs established in 2002
2004 disestablishments in England
Australian rules football clubs disestablished in 2004